Roža Piščanec (7 July 1923 – 29 September 2006) was a Slovene painter also known for her illustrations of children's books and magazines.

She won the Levstik Award for her illustrations twice, in 1954 for her illustrations for Heidi and in 1961 for František Hrubín's Medenjakova hišica (Medenjak's House). Probably her best known illustrated work is the story Kdo je napravil Vidku srajčico (Who Made Little Vid a Shirt) by Fran Levstik, first published in 1955.

References

Slovenian illustrators
Slovenian women illustrators
1923 births
2006 deaths
Levstik Award laureates
University of Ljubljana alumni
Slovenian women artists
20th-century Slovenian painters
20th-century women artists
People from the Municipality of Kidričevo